Miguel Ángel Muñoz Alonso (born 26 January 1996), known as Miguel Ángel, is a Spanish footballer who plays for Pontevedra CF as a right back.

Club career
Born in Madrid, Miguel Ángel was a Getafe CF youth graduate. On 2 March 2014, while still a junior, he made his senior debut with the reserves by starting in a 1–2 Segunda División B away loss against Bilbao Athletic; it was his maiden appearance of the campaign.

Miguel Ángel was definitely promoted to the B-team in June 2015, becoming a regular starter afterwards. On 21 April 2016 he made his first team – and La Liga – debut, coming on as a first-half substitute for injured Roberto Lago in a 2–1 away win against Real Sociedad.

On 29 June 2017, Miguel Ángel moved to Pontevedra CF in the third division.

References

External links

1996 births
Living people
Footballers from Madrid
Spanish footballers
Association football defenders
La Liga players
Segunda División players
Segunda División B players
Tercera División players
Getafe CF B players
Getafe CF footballers
Pontevedra CF footballers